The First Griffith Ministry was a ministry of the Government of Queensland and was led by Premier Samuel Griffith. It succeeded the First McIlwraith Ministry on 13 November 1883 after the latter lost the 1883 election. It was succeeded by the Second McIlwraith Ministry on 13 June 1888 after itself losing the 1888 election.

The ministry
On 13 November 1883, the Governor, Sir Anthony Musgrave, designated 6 principal executive offices of the Government, and appointed the following Members of the Parliament of Queensland to the Ministry as follows:

References
 
 Brisbane Courier, 13 November 1883.

Queensland ministries